Kubrat Venkov Pulev (born 4 May 1981) is a Bulgarian professional boxer. He has challenged twice for the unified heavyweight title in 2014 and 2020. At regional level, he has held multiple heavyweight championships, including the European title twice between 2012 and 2016. As an amateur, he won multiple medals at international tournaments, including gold at the 2008 European Championships and bronze at the 2005 World Championships, all in the super-heavyweight division. He also represented Bulgaria at the 2008 Olympics.

As of December 2020, he is ranked as the world's tenth best active heavyweight by The Ring magazine, and ninth by the Transnational Boxing Rankings Board. He was ranked by BoxRec as the world's top 10 heavyweight from 2011 to 2018.

Amateur career

Heavyweight
In February 2002, Pulev won the Strandzha Cup in his native Bulgaria. Pulev, who is nicknamed "The Cobra", beat Cuban world champion Odlanier Solís in the process. One month later, he lost a rematch to the Cuban at the semifinal of the Chemiepokal Cup. He could not participate at the Euros 2002 in Perm after breaking his arm in sparring.

At the World Championships 2003, he lost again in the first round to Odlanier Solís 7:12.

At the European boxing championships 2004 in Pula, he defeated world class Alexander Povernov (World Championships Bronze medalist 2005). Pulev did not qualify for the Olympics despite the fact that he won the last qualifying tournament in Gothenburg. He had to settle for the first reserve place because the heavyweight division consists of only 16 fighters participating in the Olympic Games.

Super-heavyweight
Pulev beat Islam Timurziev at super-heavyweight at the Strandja Cup 2005. At the EU Championships he lost the final 18:24 to Italian southpaw Roberto Cammarelle. At the 2005 World Amateur Boxing Championships he won bronze, losing for the third time to Odlanier Solís 11:25.

In 2006, at the Chemiepokal he beat Vyacheslav Glazkov and Magomed Abdusalamov. He finished at third place at the European Championships in Plovdiv. After defeating Glazkov again he was easily beaten (RSCO) by former victim and eventual winner, Islam Timurziev of Russia.

In 2007. he won the Chemiepokal tournament and was regarded as one of the favorites at the 2007 World Amateur Boxing Championships, but had a bad draw and lost early to southpaw Olympic bronze medalist and eventual winner Roberto Cammarelle.

In 2008, he won the Strandja Cup once again beating PanAm Champion Robert Alfonso 19:9.

He beat Jaroslavas Jakšto and Marko Tomasović to qualify for the Olympics 2008.
There he was upset in his first bout by young Colombian Óscar Rivas.

In absence of Roberto Cammarelle, he beat Marko Tomasović, Roman Kapitonenko and Denis Sergeev to claim the European Championship.

At the 2009 World Amateur Boxing Championships he lost again to Roberto Cammarelle.

Professional career

Early career
Pulev turned professional, at the age of 28, in September 2009 at the Jahnsportforum in Neubrandenburg, Mecklenburg-Vorpommern, Germany. He defeated Florian Benche via 2nd-round technical knockout. Pulev fought another three times in the next three months, winning them all. He ended his first professional year with 4 wins and no losses.

Career 2012–2013

Pulev vs. Dimitrenko, Ustinov 
Pulev got his first title opportunity when it was announced in March 2012 he would fight Alexander Dimitrenko (32–1, 21 KOs) on the Marco Huck vs. Ola Afolabi WBO cruiserweight championship undercard on 5 May in Erfurt, Germany for the vacant  EBU European Heavyweight Championship. Many observers were giving both fighters an even chance to win, and expected the winner of this bout to fight for the title in the near future. Pulev and his trainer Otto Ramin expected a tough fight although Dimitrenko had not fought since September 2011. Pulev was outweighed by 12 pounds at the weigh in, coming in at 245 pounds. Dimitrenko started the fight well, using his height and reach to his advantage. He also moved well on his feet to avoid punishment. In round 4, Pulev began to find his range and began countering and landing some power punch combinations of his own, rocking Dimitrenko at times. Pulev's punches were much more effective than his opponents. Dimitrenko looked faded as he entered round 11. Pulev landed a jab which slowly dropped Dimitrenko to a knee. At this point, he had taken much punishment and remained down. Referee Guido Cavalleri counted him out, giving Pulev an 11th-round KO win.

On 1 August 2012, it was announced that Pulev would defend his European and IBF International heavyweight titles against unbeaten Belarus boxer Alexander Ustinov (27-0, 21 KOs) on 29 September in Hamburg. At the time, due to being the EBA heavyweight champion, Ustinov was not ranked by the EBU. Ustinov vacated the title and the EBU confirmed he would be included in September's rankings. The fight was also set to be an IBF eliminator. Ustinov weighed in over 300 pounds on the scales. Pulev dominated the fight from the opening bell working well behind his jab and landing the harder shots. Pulev maintained the balance attack and landed more punches in round 11. Ustinov, after a slow reaction, took a knee and eventually counted out.

By early-June 2013, the IBF had finally updated its heavyweight division rankings, making Pulev the official #1 contender for its heavyweight title.

On 21 June, the EBU confirmed Alexander Dimitrenko as Pulev's mandatory challenger. They set the purse bid deadline for 10 July. On 18 July, Dimitrenko vacated his mandatory position. The EBU announced that Pulev would fight the next highest ranked fighter instead.

Pulev vs. Thompson, Abell
Having not fought in 11 months, Pulev next fought on 24 August 2013, against former world title challenger Tony Thompson (38-3, 26 KOs) in a final eliminator in Schwerin, Germany. Thompson was coming off back to back wins against British contender David Price. The fight went the 12 round distance with Pulev announced the winner. The three judges scored the fight 116–112, 118–110, and 117–111 in his favour. Thompson started off slow and defensive, but never landed anything of note during the fight. Pulev outlanded Thompson 80–28 in the final four rounds. In total, Pulev landed 145 of 405 punches thrown (36%) and Thompson connected 141 of his 419 thrown (34%).

On 8 October, EBU announced Pulev as their mandatory challenger for heavyweight champion Derek Chisora. Prior to Pulev vacating the title, Chisora was his mandatory challenger, before capturing the vacant title. There was no date set for purse bids. On 3 December, it was announced that Pulev would 'stay busy', whilst waiting for the Klitschko fight, and fight on 14 December against veteran Sherman Williams (36-13-2, 19 KO's) at the Jahnsportforum in Neubrandenburg. A few days before the fight, Williams pulled out of the fight with an injury and replaced with American Joey Abell (29-6, 28 KOs). Pulev won the bout when Abell retired in his corner after round 4. Pulev started the fight slow with Abell landing counters, however Pulev found his rhythm in round 2. Abell started well in round 4, dropping Pulev with a counter punch. Pulev got up immediately and dropped Abell three times in the round, all from body shots. During the interval, referee Charlie Fitch stopped the fight.

Career from 2014–2016
Starting the year 2014, whilst still waiting on the world title fight with Klitschko, who was due to satisfy his WBO mandatory in April against Alex Leapai, Pulev stated he would fight again in Rostock on 5 April. A month later, talks resumed for a fight between Pulev and Chisora. A purse bid date was set for 18 March. The fight would also serve as a WBO eliminator for Klitschko, despite Pulev already being IBF #1 ranked. Pulev later confirmed that he would fight American boxer Elijah McCall (12-3, 11 KOs) on the Braehmer vs. Maccarinelli undercard. Elijah was known for being the son of former WBC heavyweight champion Oliver McCall. A day later, McCall pulled out of the fight. Sauerland Event stated, "after agreeing 2 fight & docs being received. McCall watched tape of Pulev and pulled out of undercard bout." American Joey Dawejko was announced as the replacement. A day later, Ivica Perkovic (20-23, 15 KOs) replaced Dawejko, who also withdrew from the bout. On fight night, Pulev stopped Perkovic in three rounds.

Pulev vs. Klitschko
The IBF finally ordered Wladimir Klitschko vs. Pulev on 8 May 2014, and given 30 days negotiation period. Klitschko's manager Bernd Boente stated that a potential fight with WBC champion Bermane Stiverne was their main priority, a fight which would see all of the heavyweight belts at stake. Kalle Sauerland stated that he would request to get Klitschko (62-3, 52 KOs) stripped of the IBF title if he didn't fight Pulev. At the same time Deontay Wilder was named Stiverne's mandatory and the WBC stated he must fight Wilder next. With IBF purse bid split being 75–25 in favour of the champion, Klitschko requested the split be 80–20 in his favour. The IBF accepted the request. A purse bid took place on 17 June, which was won by K2 Promotions. The winning bid was $7.25 million. Sauerland Event put in a bid for $5.29 million. As per the bid, K2 had the location set as O2 World Arena in Hamburg, with a possible date being 6 September 2014. In August, Klitschko suffered a bicep injury, thus postponing the fight by at least two months. A new date of 15 November was set. HBO announced that they would air the fight live in the afternoon, making it the 19th Klitschko fight they would show. Two days before the fight, it was revealed only the IBF title would be at stake for Pulev as he and his team, however if Klitschko loses, the remaining titles would be vacated.
Despite making a spirited effort, Pulev suffered three knockdowns en route to being knocked out in round five by a devastating left hook. The time of stoppage was recorded as 2:11 of round 5. In the post-fight, Pulev said, "Wladimir is a really good opponent, but he was lucky. I want a rematch". Klitschko praised Pulev, calling him a tough competitor. CompuBox stats showed that Klitschko landed 38 of 89 punches thrown (43%), this included 47% of his power punches. Pulev managed to land only 25 of his 110 thrown (23%). This was made up of 10 jabs and 15 power shots landed. The fight drew 10.5 million viewers in Germany and 1.8 million viewers in Bulgaria (becoming the most watched sports event on the Bulgarian TV since 2007). The fight also averaged 620,000 viewers on HBO and peaked at 700,000 viewers.

Back to winning ways 
Pulev signed an contract extension with Team Sauerland on 11 February 2015. it was also revealed that Pulev would now be trained by well known German coach Ulli Wegner.

Following his first professional defeat, Pulev took 11 months out, before returning to the ring on 17 October 2015, against 41-year-old journeyman George Arias (56-13, 42 KOs) in an 8-round bout. The fight was scheduled to take place at the DM-Arena in Karlsruhe, Baden-Württemberg. Pulev also announced that he would be working with German legendary coach Ulli Wegner. The fight went the distance as Pulev won a unanimous decision with scores of 80–71, 80–71, and 79–73.

His next fight took place in December 2015 against American journeyman and former USBA heavyweight champion Maurice Harris, the fight lasted all of 100 seconds as Pulev knocked Harris down and out.

Pulev vs. Chisora, Peter 
On 15 March 2016, it was announced that Pulev would fight fellow former European champion and world title challenger Derek Chisora (25-5, 17 KOs), in an IBF title eliminator for the vacant European heavyweight title at the Barclaycard Arena in Hamburg on 7 May 2016. Despite what had seemed a fairly comfortable points win for Pulev, which saw him control the fight behind the jab, the fight ended in a split decision, with two judges scoring it 118–110 and 116–112 in Pulev's favour while the third scored it 115–113 for Chisora.

On 1 November 2016, it was announced that Pulev would fight returning former heavyweight world champion Samuel Peter (36-5, 29 KOs) on 3 December at the Arena Armeec in Sofia, Bulgaria. It was the first time in his professional career fighting in his home country. On 22 November, Pulev decided to vacate the EBU title instead entering purse bids against mandatory Mariusz Wach. Peter weighed 271 pounds for the fight. In front of 15,000 at the Arena Armeec, Pulev defeated Peter via a 3rd round RTD to win the vacant WBA Inter-Continental heavyweight title. The fight was stopped after round three when Peter was forced to retire after dislocating his right shoulder. Pulev was the more accurate and active boxer and managed to land the clear punches. He was ahead 30–27 on all three judges' scorecards after round 3.

Career from 2017–present

Pulev vs. Johnson
On 21 March 2017, Team Sauerland announced that Pulev would once again return to the Arena Armeec in Sofia, Bulgaria against another returning boxer, 37 year old former world title challenger Kevin Johnson (30-7-1, 14 KOs) of the United States. Johnson made a return to boxing, following his first knockout loss to Anthony Joshua in 2015, on 11 March in an eight-round unanimous decision win against Jamal Woods. The fight took place on 28 April 2017. The fight went 12 rounds, but inflicted with foul play. Pulev controlled all the rounds winning 120–108 on two judges cards and 119–109 on the third judges card. Pulev got away with rabbit punching throughout the fight. In round 8, referee Terry O’Connor warned Pulev, however he continued to do so. Johnson fought on the back foot, although he hit Pulev with some clean shots, it wasn't enough to win the rounds. The win kept Pulev in line for a future IBF world title shot, winning his fifth consecutive fight since his sole loss to Wladimir Klitschko and also retaining his WBA Inter-Continental heavyweight title.

Cancelled world title fight 
On 10 December 2016, Anthony Joshua knocked out Eric Molina in the third round and the Joshua vs. Klitschko fight was officially announced. WBA president Gilberto J. Mendoza confirmed that the winner will have to face mandatory challenger Luis Ortiz next, with deadlines due to be set after the unification fight. A day later the IBF announced the winner must fight their mandatory challenger Pulev. Because of this clashing with the WBA enforcing their mandatory, it was believed that either Joshua or Klitschko would have to vacate a title. On 7 June 2017, the IBF granted Joshua an exception for him to rematch Klitschko instead of fighting mandatory challenger Pulev. At this point, it was not said that the rematch would take place. Klitschko said he needed time to review his situation before agreeing to a rematch. It was only weeks after the fight, when Eddie Hearn filed the paperwork to the IBF to request the exception to the mandatory defense. IBF explained that the rematch must take place no later than 2 December 2017, and the winner must fight Pulev next with no exceptions.

On 3 August 2017, Klitschko announced on his website and social media channels that he was retiring from boxing. On 4 August, upon learning that Klitschko had retired, the IBF immediately ordered Joshua and Pulev to fight next, with a deal needing to be reached by 3 September 2017. The WBA then ordered Joshua to make his mandatory defence against their top ranked fighter Luis Ortiz, giving them 30 days to reach a deal. According to Hearn, the plan going forward was to fight Pulev next, following by Ortiz and then a potential unification fight against Deontay Wilder. On 22 August, details between the camps of Joshua and Pulev were being discussed and close to being finalised for the date of 28 October 2017, with Las Vegas as the potential host.

On 28 August, it was announced that Joshua and Pulev would fight at the Principality Stadium in Cardiff. Promoter Eddie Hearn made the official announcement on 5 September, "I'm delighted that we will be in Cardiff at the magnificent Principality Stadium for the next step of the AJ journey. Nearly 80,000 will gather on 28 October to create another unforgettable night of boxing. Anthony will meet his mandatory challenger, [IBF] No. 1-ranked Kubrat Pulev, and the card will be stacked with world championship action, domestic title fights and the very best young stars in the game. Get ready for the next episode from the biggest star in world boxing." The official press conference took place on 11 September and the following day, a reported 70,000 tickets had been sold, making it the fastest selling event. It also set the record of largest boxing attendance to be expected indoors. The previous record was Muhammad Ali vs. Leon Spinks rematch which gathered 63,000 fans at the New Orleans Superdrome in 1978. On 16 October, rumours circulated that Pulev had suffered an injury, which could see the fight being in jeopardy. The same reports suggested the injury was 10 days old, but Pulev's camp had kept it quiet. The injury was later revealed to be true and 36-year-old Carlos Takam (35-3-1, 27 KOs), who was ranked number 3 by the IBF stepped in to replace Pulev on 12 days notice. Eddie Hearn said in a statement that he received a phone call from Pulev's promoter Kalle Sauerland, advising him of a shoulder injury he sustained during sparring. Hearn revealed when the Joshua vs. Pulev fight was made, he reached out to Takam's camp, knowing they would be next in line and told them to begin a training camp and stay on standby.

Pulev vs. Hughie Fury 

In March 2018, the IBF ordered Pulev vs. Dominic Breazeale for a final eliminator, however Breazeale refused to take part. In April, the IBF ordered Pulev to fight British boxer Dillian Whyte (23-1, 17 KOs). A purse bid was set for 10 May. The purse bids were delayed as a deal between Eddie Hearn and Team Sauerland, Pulev's promoter was close to being agreed. The IBF gave them until 24 May. Despite Whyte stating that Pulev did not want the fight, Pulev stated he was more than happy to fight Whyte, but "a lot of things need to be agreed" before the fight could be confirmed. According to Nisse Sauerland, the date of 28 July was being discussed with the host venue being either London or Bulgaria. New York based promotional company, Epic Sports & Entertainment made a purse bid of $1,500,111, winning the rights of the fight. Hearn offered $831,111, which was higher than the $801,305 bid from Team Sauerland. IBF ruling states for a final eliminator, the higher ranked boxer, in this case was Pulev, would get 75% ($1,125,083.25) and Whyte would earn $375,027.75 for the fight. On 7 June, Whyte pulled out of the fight and instead Matchroom announced he would be fighting former WBO champion Joseph Parker in London on 28 July. Pulev was unhappy with the pull out and labelled Whyte and Hearn as 'extreme manipulators and plain schizophrenics' as well as accusing them of avoiding him at all costs.

On 16 June, the IBF then ordered Pulev against their #3 ranked American boxer Jarrell Miller 21–0, 18 KO). On 25 June, at the purse bid, Epic Sports & Entertainment made the winning bid of $2,111,111, much higher than the $1,000,010, which was placed by Team Sauerland. The bid meant Miller would be earning his highest purse at $527,777.75 US dollars. According to Epic Sports, the contracts were sent within two days of the purse bid. By 2 July, there was no deal made. It was said that Miller's camp were stalling, likely due to the fight taking place in Bulgaria. Miller's promoter Dmitry Salita confirmed negotiations were still ongoing however the biggest hurdle was the venue. According to IBF public relations director Jeanette Salazar, Miller had 15 days from when he received the contract to agree or the IBF would go back to the rankings.
At the time, the next highest challenger was Hughie Fury (21-1, 11 KO), who was inserted at #5 by the IBF in June. Negotiations between Pulev and Miller broke down on 10 July. The IBF ordered a purse bid to take place on 9 August. On the morning, the IBF pushed the date of the bid to 16 August. However, on that same date, the fight was agreed from both parties and was announced to take place in Sofia, Bulgaria on 27 October 2018.

Pulev defeated Fury via a 12-round unanimous decision to become the mandatory challenger for IBF heavyweight title. The scores were 117–111, 118–110, and 115–113. After a good start by Fury, he could not overcome a cut that opened up in round 2, which altered his mindset and game plan. Fury had suffered the cut over his left eye during training camp and Pulev took advantage by opening it up again. With the cut bleeding bad, it forced Hughie to fight more aggressively but cautiously. After the fight, Peter Fury said, "Hughie came into the fight with a cut above the eye. He was stitched up two weeks ago but they [the doctors] said it would heal in time for the fight and obviously it didn’t." He praised Fury for his efforts after the cut was open. Pulev used his jab often, until round 4, he started unloading on more power shots. Fury spent the majority of the second half of the fight trying to counter Pulev, however was unable to land any meaningful shot. As the fight went on, Pulev's jab became much stronger and accurate, although Pulev was caught with a right hand in round 8. Pulev clinched after being wobbled and took back control in round 9. By round 11, Fury seemed tired and spent most of the final two rounds boxing with his back against the ropes. Fury believed the cut was what ultimately lost him the fight.

Signing with Top Rank 
On 8 December 2018 Top Rank announced they had signed Pulev on a co-promotional multiyear deal. Bob Arum revealed the plan for 2019 was to have Pulev main event a card on ESPN against a known, in preparation for a future Anthony Joshua showdown. Arum had been interested in signing Pulev since they made a deal with Epic Sports to broadcast Pulev's fight against Hughie Fury on ESPN+.

Pulev vs. Anthony Joshua

On 2 March 2020, both Matchroom's Eddie Hearn and Top Rank's Bob Arum officially announced Pulev will fight Anthony Joshua at the Tottenham Hotspur Stadium in London on 20 June 2020. This then got put back due to COVID-19 and eventually took place on 12 December 2020 On 7 March, before the broadcast of Adam Kownacki vs. Robert Helenius, Joe Goossen announced he will be training Pulev for the fight.

Pulev was knocked out in round 9. He was dropped in the third round and was dropped twice again in the ninth.

Triller Triad Combat
On 27 November 2021, Pulev become Triad Combat Heavyweight World Champion after beat MMA fighter Frank Mir in the main event of a boxing vs. MMA event. Promoted by Triller and held at the Globe Life Field in Arlington, Texas, Pulev defeated Mir via TKO at 1 minute 59 seconds in the first round of a scheduled nine-round bout.

Sexual harassment allegations 
On 23 March 2019, after defeating Bogdan Dinu in Costa Mesa, Pulev forcibly kissed a female reporter Jennifer Ravalo on the lips during an interview. The California State Athletic Commission responded by suspending Pulev's licence. In response, Kubrat's younger brother, Tervel Pulev, posted a video taken hours after the incident without the knowledge of Ravalo, showing her suggestively dancing with a member of Kubrat's entourage. On 28 March 2019, Ravalo has announced that she would be taking legal action against Pulev with Gloria Allred as her lawyer. On 24 July 2019, Pulev had his boxing license reinstated by the CSAC after he completed his sexual harassment prevention class, with a caveat that his license will be revoked if similar offenses were to occur.

Personal life
Pulev has a younger brother, Tervel Pulev, who is also a professional boxer. Both brothers are named after Medieval Bulgarian rulers - Kubrat and Tervel. Pulev has declined lucrative financial offers to represent Germany, viewing it as a matter of principle not to change his national allegiance. In December 2020, Tervel Pulev revealed in an interview that Kubrat had recovered from COVID-19. Pulev has two children.

Professional boxing record

Television viewership

Germany

Bulgaria

Pay-per-view bouts

References

External links

1981 births
Living people
Boxers at the 2008 Summer Olympics
Sportspeople from Sofia
Heavyweight boxers
Super-heavyweight boxers
Olympic boxers of Bulgaria
Bulgarian male boxers
AIBA World Boxing Championships medalists
European Boxing Union champions